Joseph 'Joe' Akomadi (born 23 September 1999) is a Ghanaian professional footballer who plays as a forward.

Club career 
Akomadi started his career with Ghanaian side Keliz FC where he spent four seasons before moving to Aspire Academy in the summer of 2015. He signed a four-year-contract with Hatayspor which will run until the summer of 2023 from SportsLife FC. Akomadi won his first major silverware by winning the 2019–20 TFF First League title with Hatayspor and securing promotion to the Süper Lig. He was promoted to the Hatayspor first team from the U21 side and made his debut for Hatayspor in the last game of the season as he came off the bench to play in their 3–1 win over Bursaspor. He amassed a total of 25 appearances for the U21 side in the 2018–19 season and scored two goals. He has officially scored three goals for Hatayspor in U19 and U21 games since he joined the club and has played a total of 30 appearances for the club in all ranks.

Statistics

References

External links
 
 

1999 births
Footballers from Accra
Living people
Ghanaian footballers
Association football forwards
Hatayspor footballers
TFF First League players
Süper Lig players
Ghanaian expatriate footballers
Ghanaian expatriate sportspeople in Qatar
Ghanaian expatriate sportspeople in Turkey
Expatriate footballers in Qatar
Expatriate footballers in Turkey